Ralph Raffles (15 May 1920 – January 2008) was a British bobsledder. He competed in the four-man event at the 1956 Winter Olympics.

References

1920 births
2008 deaths
British male bobsledders
Olympic bobsledders of Great Britain
Bobsledders at the 1956 Winter Olympics
Sportspeople from Prestwich